Mian Arshad Hussain (9 January 1910 – 4 October 1987), he served as Foreign Minister of Pakistan (1968 – 1969).

In 1959, Mian Arshad Husain was appointed Pakistan's Ambassador to Sweden, in 1961 to Moscow, and in 1963, he was appointed High Commissioner to India. In 1968, he gave the Chinese leader Mao Zedong a basket of Pakistani mangoes, which caused the rise of a "Mango Cult" in China.

References

1910 births
1987 deaths
Foreign Ministers of Pakistan
Ambassadors of Pakistan to Sweden
Ambassadors of Pakistan to the Soviet Union
High Commissioners of Pakistan to India